was a Japanese professional sumo wrestler from Tokyo. His highest rank was ōzeki.

Career
Born  in Chuo, Tokyo, he joined Dewanoumi stable and was coached by former yokozuna Hitachiyama. He made his debut in May 1917, and was promoted to the jūryō division in May 1922. After winning the jūryō division championship in January 1923 he reached the top makuuchi division in May 1923. In January 1926, at the rank of maegashira 2, he finished as runner-up to yokozuna Tsunenohana with a fine 10–1 record. His earned him promotion to sekiwake, and after two more runner-up performances he was promoted to ōzeki in May 1927.

In January 1928, he won his only top division yūshō, or championship, but it caused great controversy. On Day 10, he scored a win by default (fusensho) against Nishinoumi Kajirō III, who was a no-show for the bout. His rival for the championship, veteran maegashira and former sekiwake Misugiiso, had won all his bouts in actual fights but was then defeated by strong komusubi Tamanishiki (later yokozuna) on the 11th day. At the end of the tournament they both had 10–1 records, as Hitachiiwa had defeated yokozuna Miyagiyama on the final day. Hitachiiwa and Misugiiso were too far apart in rank to have been paired against each other during the tournament, and as there was no playoff system in place at that time, Hitachiiwa, in the higher ōzeki rank was awarded the yūshō. Many people sympathized with Misugiiso as it had cost him his only chance to win a championship. Misugiiso was only able to win two more bouts in his career and retired a year later.

The controversy gathered around the system of keeping score for matches won by default as one wrestler does not appear for their scheduled fight (fusensho). At the time, only in the last two days of a tournament could a win by default be accepted, and there was no formal announcement (kachi-nanori) of the winner by default, so both wrestlers would be scored as not appearing for the match. In the following tournament in March 1928, the modern system was established where the winner by default was officially scored as a win and not a no-show, as it was in the past.

Hitachiiwa fell ill after the dispute and was unable to capitalise on his win, sitting out the March 1928 tournament. He was unable to record consistently good results in his following career and was never in contention for another championship. He retired in March 1931. He remained in the sumo world as an elder, under the name , and worked as a coach in Dewanoumi stable until his death.

Career record
In 1927 Tokyo and Osaka sumo merged and four tournaments a year in Tokyo and other locations began to be held.

See also
Glossary of sumo terms
List of past sumo wrestlers
List of sumo tournament top division champions
List of sumo tournament second division champions
List of ōzeki

References

External links
Japan Sumo Association profile

1900 births
People from Chūō, Tokyo
1957 deaths
Japanese sumo wrestlers
Sumo people from Tokyo
Ōzeki